Huddersfield Town's 1956–57 campaign was a fairly poor season for the Town under Andy Beattie and then his assistant Bill Shankly, following the previous season's relegation from Division 1. They finished in 12th place with 42 points, 12 points behind 2nd placed Nottingham Forest, but only 12 points ahead of 20th placed Notts County.

Squad at the start of the season

Review
Following the previous season's relegation from Division 1, Andy Beattie tried to get Town back into the 1st Division at the first attempt. A mixed start to the season saw Town gain some memorable wins including an opening day 3–2 win at Anfield over Liverpool. Beattie resigned in early November and was replaced by his assistant Bill Shankly, who would then lead Liverpool to greatness in the 1960s and 1970s. Memorable wins during the season for Town were a 5–0 away win at Barnsley and a 6–2 win over West Ham United, where defender Ken Taylor, playing as an emergency striker, scored 4 goals.

This season also marked the debuts of Town's future stalwarts Kevin McHale and Les Massie and future British transfer record holder Denis Law. Law broke the record for the youngest player ever to make a first-team appearance when he came on at the age of 16 years, 303 days, beating McHale's record by 26 days, which he set earlier in the season.

Town also had a good run in the FA Cup, where they reached the 5th round, before bowing out to Burnley in a 2–1 defeat in front of over 55,000 fans at Leeds Road. Town finished the league season in 12th position with 44 points, but it would be nearly 15 years until Town returned to the big time.

Squad at the end of the season

Results

Division Two

FA Cup

Appearances and goals

1956-57
English football clubs 1956–57 season